The Stepping Stones are three prominent rocks lying  north of Limitrophe Island, off the southwest coast of Anvers Island, Antarctica. The Stepping Stones form one of a series of small boat refuges for parties working between nearby Palmer Station and Biscoe Bay, and therefore form "stepping stones" for coastal trips. Named by Palmer Station personnel in 1972.

See also
 List of Antarctic and sub-Antarctic islands

References

Islands of the Palmer Archipelago